"Maybe I'm a Leo" is a song by the British rock group Deep Purple, from their 1972 album Machine Head.

History 
Roger Glover says: "I wrote the riff to "Maybe I’m a Leo" after hearing John Lennon's "How Do You Sleep?". I liked the idea that the riff didn't start on the down beat, like 99% of riffs do. Most of the songs on Machine Head were from the first take, or not long after."

Singer Ian Gillan is a Leo (born 19 August), the only group member at the time with that astrological sign.

The song was rarely played by the band live; however, three live recordings of it have been released on albums: Deep Purple in Concert, recorded in 1972; Live at the Olympia '96; and Live at Montreux 2011.

The SACD version of Machine Head has an alternative guitar solo on "Maybe I'm a Leo".

Personnel
Ritchie Blackmore – guitar
Ian Gillan – vocals
Roger Glover – bass guitar
Jon Lord – organ
Ian Paice – drums

Cover versions
 The Atomic Bitchwax on their album 3.
 Gov't Mule on The Deep End, Volume 1 in which Roger Glover made a guest appearance.
 Paul Gilbert on Smoke on the Water, a Tribute to Deep Purple
 Van Halen used to perform the song during their early concerts.
 Glenn Hughes, Luis Maldonado & Chad Smith on Re-Machined: A Tribute to Deep Purple's Machine Head.

References

1972 songs
Deep Purple songs
Songs written by Ian Gillan
Songs written by Roger Glover
Songs written by Ritchie Blackmore
Songs written by Jon Lord
Songs written by Ian Paice